Librije's Zusje (English:Librijes little sister) was a restaurant in Zwolle, Netherlands. It was a fine dining restaurant that was awarded one Michelin star in 2009 and retained that rating until 2011. In the period 2012-2014 the restaurant was awarded two stars.

The restaurant was owned by Jonnie and Thérèse Boer and was part of the culinary group around De Librije. It was located in a former women prison, which they share with Librije's Hotel and Librije's Atelier (cook- and wine school).

Head chef was originally Sidney Schutte. After the departure of Schutte in 2009, Alwin Leemhuis took over. Leemhuis left in 2012 and was succeeded by Maik Kuijpers

On 1 May 2014 the second sister of De Librije opened in Amsterdam. This restaurant, also named Librije's Zusje is located in the Waldorf Astoria Hotel. On 14 September 2014 it was announced that Librije's Zusje (Zwolle) would close on 31 December 2014 and that De Librije would take over the location.

See also
List of Michelin starred restaurants in the Netherlands

Sources and references 

Restaurants in the Netherlands
Michelin Guide starred restaurants in the Netherlands
Buildings and structures in Zwolle
Restaurants established in 2008
Defunct restaurants in the Netherlands